Huppen is a surname. Notable people with the surname include:

Hermann Huppen (born 1938), Belgian comics artist and writer
Jan Huppen (born 1942), Dutch boxer